Goodtime Girls is an American sitcom that ran on ABC from January 22, 1980, until August 29, 1980. It was created by Leonora Thuna, and produced by Thomas L. Miller, Edward K. Milkis and Robert L. Boyett, in association with Garry Marshall's Henderson Productions and Paramount Television. It is a period piece comedy set during World War II, which was the producers' 1940s answer to their top 1950s-themed hits Happy Days and Laverne & Shirley.

Synopsis
Set in Washington, D.C., in 1942, Goodtime Girls told the story of four women who found themselves having to share a small attic apartment at the Coolidge Boarding House, due to a regional apartment shortage, which occurred as a result of women striking out on their own and supporting themselves during wartime. In the beginning, three of the girls—Edith Bedelmeyer (Annie Potts), Sioux City native Betty Crandall (Lorna Patterson), and Loretta Smoot (Georgia Engel)--had agreed to share space together in the attic at Coolidge. However, just when they thought things couldn't get more cramped, Camille Rittenhouse (Francine Tacker), a snobbish reporter who was covering a newspaper story on the apartment shortage, wound up being their fourth roommate when she herself lost her apartment and was in need of a new place. This didn't immediately sit well with the other women, not only because of the tight quarters barely accommodating four, but since Camille's holier-than-thou personality clashed with the others, especially with Edith, who became the unofficial leader of the group. The gang did learn to get along, as they grew closer in a time when a lot of emotional and moral support was needed for each other, with America working on "getting Uncle Sam out of a jam".

The ladies also had a lot of fun things to look forward to; despite the shortage of consumer goods, cars, and men, many soldiers and sailors on military leave passed through to romance them. Edith and Betty, who were younger and single, were most frequently sought after by these bachelors. Loretta was the middle-aged war bride, who was holding out hope for her husband's safe return. Then there were two resident single men in the building, macho hustler cabbie Frankie Millardo (Adrian Zmed), who lived downstairs with his buddy Benny Loman (Peter Scolari), a street performer whose pantomime, juggling and unicycle acts were part of the regular physical comedy and pratfalls seen in every episode. Frankie, who had been the one who drove Betty, Edith and Loretta to the boarding house, wants to prove himself by joining the military but is turned down because he has flat feet. Frankie and Benny often joined in the girls' escapades, escorting them around town and engaging in periodic jitterbug and big band dance sessions. With play came work: Edith was employed at the Office of Price Admissions, as mentioned, Camille was a newspaper reporter, Betty worked for the U.S. Secretary of War, and Loretta, at The Pentagon for bureaucrat General Culpepper (seen in guest appearances by Richard Stahl).

The boarding house was run by its namesakes, George and Irma Coolidge (Merwin Goldsmith and Marcia Lewis), a married couple who controlled their units very strictly. Also seen around was Skeeter (Sparky Marcus), a young boy who spent a lot of time with the Coolidges.

Cast
Annie Potts as Edith Bedelmeyer
Merwin Goldsmith as George Coolidge 
Lorna Patterson as Betty Crandall
Adrian Zmed as Frankie Molardo 
Georgia Engel as Loretta Smoot
Francine Tacker as Camille Rittenhouse
Marcia Lewis as Irma Coolidge 
Peter Scolari as Benny Lohman

Scheduling
Goodtime Girls premiered in January 1980 on Tuesday nights, immediately following Happy Days, of which this series, unlike others produced by Garry Marshall and Miller/Milkis/Boyett, was not spun off from or in any ways connected to, storyline-wise. ABC kept the show on through the end of February sweeps, but then pulled it off the schedule for over a month until it returned in April, when it then aired for three consecutive weeks in a Saturday 8:30/7:30c slot. The show was then taken off again, and since it garnered small audiences during both these runs, the network officially canceled the show during May 1980 upfronts. Five more original episodes turned up on Fridays at 8:30/7:30c that August, leading up to the final produced episode's broadcast on August 29, 1980. The series' third episode ("Night and Day") was the only one that ABC chose not to air during its run, for unexplained reasons.

Episodes

Notes
Marcia Lewis (Irma Coolidge) had previously worked with Garry Marshall on his short-lived 1978 sitcom Who's Watching the Kids?, while Peter Scolari (Benny Loman) would ultimately go on to work with Miller, Milkis and Boyett on their separate venture, Bosom Buddies, on ABC in the fall of 1980. Adrian Zmed (Frankie Millardo) would later gain more fame as Officer Vince Romano on the series T.J. Hooker on ABC and later CBS.  He would also host the show Dance Fever.

Lorna Patterson (Betty Crandall) worked with Francine Tacker (Camille Rittenhouse), who was married to the man Lorna herself would later marry, actor Robert Ginty.

Francine Tacker originally was Elizabeth Logan in the TV adaptation of the novel and movie, The Paper Chase, and would later be the second of three actresses (Morgan Fairchild and Priscilla Beaulieu Presley would be the others) who played Jenna Wade on the series, Dallas. Patterson would gain later fame in the TV adaptation of the movie Private Benjamin, playing the title role of Judy Benjamin, the role played in the movie by Goldie Hawn.

Georgia Engel (Loretta Smoot) was already well-established from her being well known as Georgette Baxter from The Mary Tyler Moore Show, while Annie Potts (Edith Bedelmeyer) would later achieve fame with the movie Ghostbusters, where she played Janine Melnitz, her long-running role of pragmatic interior designer Mary Jo Shively in the comedy, Designing Women, her role of Mary Elizabeth Sims on the Lifetime drama Any Day Now, and as Sheldon Cooper's Mee Maw in Young Sheldon.

Providing further synergy between the family of Marshall-produced shows, actors from Happy Days and Laverne & Shirley, respectively, guest starred on Goodtime Girls. Scott Baio appeared in one episode as Edith's younger brother who decided to enlist for the war. Michael McKean guest starred in another as a war veteran who was recovering in a local Washington, D.C., hospital after losing his legs in battle.

External links
 
 Brooks, Tim and Marsh, Earle, The Complete Directory to Prime Time Network and Cable TV Shows 1946–Present

1980s American sitcoms
1980 American television series debuts
1980 American television series endings
American Broadcasting Company original programming
English-language television shows
Television series by CBS Studios
Television series set in the 1940s
Television shows set in Washington, D.C.
World War II television comedy series
Women in Washington, D.C.